Roscidotoga callicomae is a moth of the family Nepticulidae. It is found along the south-eastern coast of New South Wales and in Queensland.

The larvae feed on Callicoma serratifolia. They mine the leaves of their host plant.

References

External links
Australian Faunal Directory

Moths described in 2000
Moths of Australia
Nepticulidae